The Braille pattern dots-1456 is a 6-dot braille cell with both top, the middle right, and bottom right dots raised, or an 8-dot braille cell with both top, the upper-middle right, and lower-middle right dots raised. It is represented by the Unicode code point U+2839, and in Braille ASCII with a question mark: ?.

Unified Braille

In unified international braille, the braille pattern dots-1456 is used to represent a voiceless dental fricative, i.e. /θ/, and is otherwise assigned as needed.

Table of unified braille values

Other braille

Plus dots 7 and 8

Related to Braille pattern dots-1456 are Braille patterns 14567, 14568, and 145678, which are used in 8-dot braille systems, such as Gardner-Salinas and Luxembourgish Braille.

Related 8-dot kantenji patterns

In the Japanese kantenji braille, the standard 8-dot Braille patterns 2568, 12568, 24568, and 124568 are the patterns related to Braille pattern dots-1456, since the two additional dots of kantenji patterns 01456, 14567, and 014567 are placed above the base 6-dot cell, instead of below, as in standard 8-dot braille.

Kantenji using braille patterns 2568, 12568, 24568, or 124568

This listing includes kantenji using Braille pattern dots-1456 for all 6349 kanji found in JIS C 6226-1978.

  - 発

Variants and thematic compounds

  -  selector 1 + す/発  =  巨
  -  selector 4 + す/発  =  臣
  -  selector 6 + selector 6 + す/発  =  乕
  -  す/発 + selector 1  =  冬
  -  す/発 + selector 1 + selector 1  =  夊
  -  す/発 + selector 2  =  罪
  -  す/発 + selector 2 + selector 2  =  网
  -  す/発 + selector 3  =  虎
  -  す/発 + selector 3 + selector 3  =  虍
  -  す/発 + selector 4  =  久
  -  す/発 + selector 4 + selector 4  =  夂
  -  数 + す/発  =  癸

Compounds of 発 and 癶

  -  よ/广 + す/発  =  廃
  -  よ/广 + よ/广 + す/発  =  廢
  -  す/発 + と/戸  =  登
  -  や/疒 + す/発 + と/戸  =  嶝
  -  心 + す/発 + と/戸  =  橙
  -  ま/石 + す/発 + と/戸  =  磴
  -  か/金 + す/発 + と/戸  =  鐙
  -  す/発 + す/発  =  發
  -  て/扌 + 宿 + す/発  =  撥
  -  に/氵 + 宿 + す/発  =  溌
  -  や/疒 + 宿 + す/発  =  癈
  -  す/発 + 宿 + selector 1  =  癶
  -  せ/食 + 宿 + す/発  =  醗

Compounds of 巨

  -  や/疒 + す/発  =  矩
  -  み/耳 + す/発  =  距
  -  す/発 + て/扌  =  拒
  -  す/発 + に/氵  =  渠
  -  火 + selector 1 + す/発  =  炬
  -  の/禾 + selector 1 + す/発  =  秬
  -  く/艹 + selector 1 + す/発  =  苣
  -  か/金 + selector 1 + す/発  =  鉅

Compounds of 臣

  -  つ/土 + す/発  =  堅
  -  る/忄 + つ/土 + す/発  =  慳
  -  心 + つ/土 + す/発  =  樫
  -  か/金 + つ/土 + す/発  =  鏗
  -  せ/食 + つ/土 + す/発  =  鰹
  -  ゐ/幺 + す/発  =  緊
  -  を/貝 + す/発  =  賢
  -  ふ/女 + す/発  =  姫
  -  ら/月 + す/発  =  臓
  -  ら/月 + ら/月 + す/発  =  臟
  -  く/艹 + す/発  =  蔵
  -  く/艹 + く/艹 + す/発  =  藏
  -  め/目 + す/発  =  覧
  -  め/目 + め/目 + す/発  =  覽
  -  て/扌 + め/目 + す/発  =  攬
  -  心 + め/目 + す/発  =  欖
  -  い/糹/#2 + め/目 + す/発  =  纜
  -  す/発 + ⺼  =  監
  -  な/亻 + す/発 + ⺼  =  儖
  -  き/木 + す/発 + ⺼  =  檻
  -  ち/竹 + す/発 + ⺼  =  籃
  -  い/糹/#2 + す/発 + ⺼  =  繿
  -  ね/示 + す/発 + ⺼  =  襤
  -  す/発 + な/亻  =  臥
  -  す/発 + う/宀/#3  =  臨
  -  う/宀/#3 + selector 4 + す/発  =  宦
  -  す/発 + ま/石 + selector 1  =  竪
  -  へ/⺩ + 宿 + す/発  =  臧
  -  と/戸 + 宿 + す/発  =  豎
  -  を/貝 + 宿 + す/発  =  贓
  -  お/頁 + 宿 + す/発  =  頤

Compounds of 冬

  -  い/糹/#2 + す/発  =  終
  -  心 + す/発 + selector 1  =  柊
  -  や/疒 + す/発 + selector 1  =  疼
  -  く/艹 + す/発 + selector 1  =  苳
  -  む/車 + す/発 + selector 1  =  螽
  -  せ/食 + す/発 + selector 1  =  鮗
  -  と/戸 + す/発 + selector 1  =  鼕

Compounds of 罪, 网, and ⺲

  -  そ/馬 + す/発  =  罵
  -  す/発 + し/巿  =  欝
  -  す/発 + す/発 + し/巿  =  鬱
  -  す/発 + ん/止  =  罠
  -  す/発 + る/忄  =  罨
  -  す/発 + め/目  =  置
  -  す/発 + ね/示  =  罰
  -  す/発 + 日  =  署
  -  心 + す/発 + 日  =  薯
  -  す/発 + ら/月  =  罷
  -  て/扌 + す/発 + ら/月  =  擺
  -  す/発 + ら/月 + 火  =  羆
  -  す/発 + り/分  =  罹
  -  す/発 + い/糹/#2  =  羅
  -  心 + す/発 + い/糹/#2  =  蘿
  -  ひ/辶 + す/発 + い/糹/#2  =  邏
  -  か/金 + す/発 + い/糹/#2  =  鑼
  -  す/発 + ろ/十  =  羈
  -  す/発 + ひ/辶  =  蔑
  -  ね/示 + す/発 + ひ/辶  =  襪
  -  と/戸 + す/発 + ひ/辶  =  韈
  -  す/発 + え/訁  =  詈
  -  す/発 + え/訁 + し/巿  =  罸
  -  す/発 + を/貝  =  買
  -  す/発 + つ/土 + か/金  =  睾
  -  す/発 + selector 4 + ふ/女  =  罘
  -  す/発 + れ/口 + ろ/十  =  罟
  -  す/発 + き/木 + き/木  =  罧
  -  す/発 + 日 + と/戸  =  罩
  -  す/発 + 宿 + つ/土  =  罫
  -  す/発 + い/糹/#2 + ら/月  =  羂
  -  す/発 + く/艹 + し/巿  =  羃
  -  す/発 + け/犬 + か/金  =  羇

Compounds of 虎, 虍, and 乕

  -  す/発 + 心  =  慮
  -  に/氵 + す/発 + 心  =  濾
  -  か/金 + す/発 + 心  =  鑢
  -  す/発 + 囗  =  戯
  -  す/発 + す/発 + 囗  =  戲
  -  す/発 + た/⽥  =  膚
  -  す/発 + か/金  =  虐
  -  や/疒 + す/発 + か/金  =  瘧
  -  え/訁 + す/発 + か/金  =  謔
  -  す/発 + 火  =  虚
  -  つ/土 + す/発 + 火  =  墟
  -  ん/止 + す/発 + 火  =  歔
  -  す/発 + ぬ/力  =  虜
  -  す/発 + こ/子  =  虞
  -  れ/口 + す/発  =  号
  -  れ/口 + れ/口 + す/発  =  號
  -  せ/食 + れ/口 + す/発  =  饕
  -  う/宀/#3 + す/発 + selector 3  =  彪
  -  へ/⺩ + す/発 + selector 3  =  琥
  -  ね/示 + す/発 + selector 3  =  褫
  -  せ/食 + す/発 + selector 3  =  鯱
  -  す/発 + す/発 + そ/馬  =  據
  -  ひ/辶 + す/発 + そ/馬  =  遽
  -  せ/食 + す/発 + そ/馬  =  醵
  -  す/発 + す/発 + そ/馬  =  據
  -  す/発 + 宿 + た/⽥  =  盧
  -  ん/止 + 宿 + す/発  =  罅
  -  す/発 + 龸 + selector 3  =  虔
  -  す/発 + 宿 + も/門  =  虧
  -  か/金 + 宿 + す/発  =  鑪
  -  ひ/辶 + す/発  =  逓
  -  ひ/辶 + ひ/辶 + す/発  =  遞

Compounds of 久 and 夂

  -  え/訁 + す/発  =  変
  -  え/訁 + え/訁 + す/発  =  變
  -  お/頁 + す/発  =  夏
  -  よ/广 + お/頁 + す/発  =  厦
  -  れ/口 + お/頁 + す/発  =  嗄
  -  selector 1 + お/頁 + す/発  =  夐
  -  へ/⺩ + お/頁 + す/発  =  瓊
  -  と/戸 + す/発  =  履
  -  ゆ/彳 + す/発  =  復
  -  氷/氵 + す/発  =  覆
  -  ⺼ + す/発  =  腹
  -  ね/示 + す/発  =  複
  -  む/車 + す/発  =  輹
  -  火 + す/発  =  灸
  -  の/禾 + す/発  =  稜
  -  心 + の/禾 + す/発  =  薐
  -  さ/阝 + す/発  =  陵
  -  す/発 + れ/口  =  各
  -  け/犬 + す/発  =  狢
  -  せ/食 + す/発  =  酪
  -  も/門 + す/発  =  閣
  -  れ/口 + す/発 + れ/口  =  咯
  -  る/忄 + す/発 + れ/口  =  恪
  -  て/扌 + す/発 + れ/口  =  挌
  -  火 + す/発 + れ/口  =  烙
  -  へ/⺩ + す/発 + れ/口  =  珞
  -  く/艹 + す/発 + れ/口  =  茖
  -  け/犬 + す/発 + れ/口  =  貉
  -  を/貝 + す/発 + れ/口  =  賂
  -  む/車 + す/発 + れ/口  =  輅
  -  そ/馬 + す/発 + れ/口  =  駱
  -  か/金 + す/発 + れ/口  =  骼
  -  へ/⺩ + す/発  =  麦
  -  へ/⺩ + へ/⺩ + す/発  =  麥
  -  す/発 + 宿 + け/犬  =  麩
  -  す/発 + 宿 + ん/止  =  麪
  -  す/発 + も/門 + selector 2  =  麭
  -  も/門 + へ/⺩ + す/発  =  麹
  -  す/発 + selector 3 + け/犬  =  麸
  -  す/発 + め/目 + selector 4  =  麺
  -  す/発 + 龸  =  処
  -  す/発 + そ/馬  =  拠
  -  す/発 + す/発 + 龸  =  處
  -  す/発 + す/発 + 龸  =  處
  -  す/発 + き/木  =  条
  -  す/発 + す/発 + き/木  =  條
  -  に/氵 + す/発 + き/木  =  滌
  -  心 + す/発 + き/木  =  篠
  -  た/⽥ + す/発  =  畝
  -  き/木 + す/発 + selector 4  =  柩
  -  へ/⺩ + す/発 + selector 4  =  玖
  -  や/疒 + す/発 + selector 4  =  疚
  -  か/金 + す/発 + selector 4  =  鑁
  -  氷/氵 + 宿 + す/発  =  凌
  -  れ/口 + 宿 + す/発  =  咎
  -  や/疒 + う/宀/#3 + す/発  =  崚
  -  よ/广 + 宿 + す/発  =  廈
  -  る/忄 + 宿 + す/発  =  愎
  -  て/扌 + も/門 + す/発  =  擱
  -  心 + 宿 + す/発  =  稷
  -  す/発 + の/禾 + selector 1  =  粂
  -  い/糹/#2 + 宿 + す/発  =  綾
  -  心 + 龸 + す/発  =  蔆
  -  む/車 + 宿 + す/発  =  蝮
  -  す/発 + の/禾 + 日  =  馥
  -  せ/食 + 龸 + す/発  =  鰒

Compounds of 癸

  -  心 + す/発  =  葵
  -  て/扌 + 数 + す/発  =  揆

Other compounds

  -  て/扌 + す/発  =  探
  -  に/氵 + す/発  =  深
  -  日 + す/発  =  旬
  -  ほ/方 + す/発  =  殉
  -  ゆ/彳 + 日 + す/発  =  徇
  -  る/忄 + 日 + す/発  =  恂
  -  に/氵 + 日 + す/発  =  洵
  -  い/糹/#2 + 日 + す/発  =  絢
  -  心 + 日 + す/発  =  荀
  -  え/訁 + 日 + す/発  =  詢
  -  き/木 + す/発  =  枢
  -  き/木 + き/木 + す/発  =  樞
  -  は/辶 + す/発  =  趨
  -  う/宀/#3 + す/発  =  須
  -  と/戸 + う/宀/#3 + す/発  =  鬚
  -  す/発 + さ/阝  =  即
  -  れ/口 + す/発 + さ/阝  =  喞
  -  け/犬 + 宿 + す/発  =  彗
  -  た/⽥ + 宿 + す/発  =  畆
  -  す/発 + selector 4 + か/金  =  罕

Notes

Braille patterns